Bruno Landi (born 5 December 1928) is an Italian former racing cyclist. He won the 1953 edition of the Giro di Lombardia.

References

External links
 

1928 births
Living people
Italian male cyclists
Cyclists from Liguria
Sportspeople from the Province of La Spezia